Mount Dent is a summit that straddles the border between British Columbia and Alberta, Canada.

Mount Dent was named in 1899 by J. Norman Collie after Clinton Thomas Dent, an English mountaineer and past president of the UK Alpine Club.

See also 
 Geography of Alberta
 Geography of British Columbia

References

Mountains of Banff National Park
Three-thousanders of Alberta
Alberta's Rockies